Toarp is a neighbourhood of the Borough of Oxie, Malmö Municipality, Skåne County, Sweden. It was a separate locality until 2015 and had 219 inhabitants in 2010.

References

Neighbourhoods of Malmö
Populated places in Malmö Municipality
Populated places in Skåne County